Polokwane City Football Club is a South African professional football club based in the city of Polokwane in the Limpopo province that currently plays in the second tier National First Division. The team currently plays its home matches at the Peter Mokaba Stadium.

History
Polokwane City FC was established in 2012 although after the owners of Bay United sold the franchise to the Mogaladi family. After playing in various temporary venues, the club was moved officially from Port Elizabeth to Polokwane City.

Bay United originally came into existence in 2006 when the franchise of the struggling National First Division club Maritzburg United was purchased and relocated to Port Elizabeth. The club spent one season in the Premier Soccer League, and the other years of its existence in the National First Division. Following the 2010–11 NFD season, the club's NFD franchise was moved to Polokwane, Limpopo.

In May 2013 City was promoted to the Premier Soccer League.

Honours
National First Division: 1
Champions: 2012–13

November 2012 accident
Four of the club's players died in a traffic accident on 11 November 2012. The crash occurred on the R71 highway, near Polokwane as the players were returning from their match against FC AK. A 36-year-old man was arrested on suspicion of drunken and reckless driving. The deceased players were:
Khomotso Silvester Mpaketsane (27) – born 13 April 1985 – joined the club in January 2011 (during Bay United F.C. season) and stayed after move to Polokwane
 Benjamin Moeketsi Nthete (23) – born 22 February 1989 – attacker who joined the club in 2012 on loan from Orlando Pirates
Mojalefa Robert Mphuthi (21) – born 31 August 1991 – striker, nicknamed 'Small', who joined the club after it moved to Polokwane
Koketso Isaiah Takalo (20) – born 15 February 1992 – left-wing, nicknamed 'Kaiser' or 'KK', who joined the club after it moved to Polokwane

Club officials/Technical team
Owner/President:  Phillemon Moloi
Chairman:  Isaac Moloi
Team manager:  Molato Motloung
Coach:  Clinton Larsen
Fitness coach:  Patuwe Tsotetsi
Assistant coach:  Cynthia Leteane
Physiotherapists:  Puleng Mokoena
Kit Manager:  Monyane Sabesa
Goalkeeper coach:"'Sello Modise"'

Current squad
Updated 10 March 2023.

Foreigners
In the South African PSL, only five non-South African nationals can be registered. Foreign players who have acquired permanent residency can be registered as locals. Namibians born before 1990 can be registered as South Africans.

 Boban Zirintusa
 George Chigova
 Carlington Nyadombo
 Banele Sikhondze

permanent residency
 Essau Kanyenda

Shirt sponsor & kit manufacturer
Shirt sponsor: None
Kit manufacturer: Mrprice Sports

Notable former coaches
 Vladislav Heric (1 July 2012 – 21 Jan 2013)
 Duncan Lechesa (22 Jan 2013 – 18 Sept 2013)
 Eduardo Schoeler (interim) (18 Sept 2013 – 20 Oct 2013)
 Boebie Solomons (20 Oct 2013 – 1 Sept 2014)
 Kosta Papić (5 Sept 2014 – 15 Oct 2015)
 Júlio Leal (12 Nov 2015 – 6 July 2016)
 Luc Eymael (6 July 2016 – 2018)
 Jozef Vukušič (2018–2019)

References

External links
 
 Premier Soccer League
 PSL Club Info
 South African Football Association
 Confederation of African Football

 
Soccer clubs in Limpopo
National First Division clubs
Polokwane
2012 establishments in South Africa
Association football clubs established in 2012